Schönthal is a municipality in the district of Cham in Bavaria in Germany.

It was formerly the location of Schönthal Priory, secularised in 1802.

References

Cham (district)